The 1992 ARFU Asian Rugby Championship was the 13th edition  of the tournament, and was played in Seoul. The 8 teams were divided in two pool, with final between the winner of both of them. Japan won the tournament.

Tournament

Pool 1

Pool 2

Finals

Third Place Final

First Place Final

References

1992
1992 rugby union tournaments for national teams
International rugby union competitions hosted by South Korea